The Seven Monuments is an embanked stone circle and National Monument located in County Galway, Ireland.

Location

The stones stand by the roadside about 3.4 km (2 miles) southeast of Loughrea.

History

The Seven Monuments were erected c. 2500–500 BC.

Description
The Seven Monuments are an embanked stone circle with central cairn.

Nearby is a terraced mound which may have been an assembly-place.

References

National Monuments in County Galway
Archaeological sites in County Galway